Malene Clarin Frandsen (born 25 October 1995) is a Danish ice hockey player and member of the Danish national ice hockey team, currently playing with the Malmö Redhawks Dam of the Swedish Damettan.

She has represented Denmark at nine IIHF Women's World Championships, including at the Top Division tournament of the 2021 IIHF Women's World Championship.

References

External links 
 

Living people
1996 births
People from Tårnby Municipality
Danish women's ice hockey defencemen
Göteborg HC players
Danish expatriate ice hockey people
Danish expatriate sportspeople in Sweden
Expatriate ice hockey players in Sweden
Ice hockey players at the 2022 Winter Olympics
Olympic ice hockey players of Denmark
Sportspeople from the Capital Region of Denmark
European Women's Hockey League players